Hangnaameedhoo (Dhivehi: ހަންޏާމީދޫ) is one of the inhabited islands of Ari Atoll, belonging to the Alif Dhaal Atoll administrative division.

Geography

Demography

Economy 
As of January 2020 there are 12 guest house in Hangnaameedhoo. The guest houses provide the island with direct employment, and many other indirect economic benefits to the island. Most guest houses are funded by direct investments by local residents of the island. 

Guest houses provide various excursions, including: whale shark watching, manta rays, off island snorkeling, fishing, scuba diving, sand bank and picnic island visiting (including overnight staying).

References

Islands of the Maldives